Busan or Pusan (Bu-san) is the second-largest city of South Korea. 

Busan or Bu San or similar, may refer to:

Places
 Busan-myeon, a myeon (township) in Jangheung County, Jeollanam-do, South Korea
 Busan, the modern site of the Ancient city and bishopric Bosana (Syria), now a Latin Catholic titular see

Bridges
 Busan Bridge
 Busan Bridge, an old name of Yeongdo Bridge
 Busan Harbor Bridge

Ports
Busan Harbor
Busan Naval Base

Stations
Busan Station, a railway station

Sports
 Busan Asiad Main Stadium
 Busan Yachting Center

People and characters
 Cha Bu-san, a fictional character from South Korean TV show Will It Snow for Christmas?
 Park Bu-san, a fictional character from South Korean TV show All About My Romance

Institutions

Museums
 Busan Museum
 Busan Marine Natural History Museum
 Busan Modern History Museum
 Korea National Maritime Museum

Universities
Busan
 Busan Arts College
 Busan Institute of Science and Technology
 Busan National University of Education
 Busan University of Foreign Studies, also known as "Pusan University of Foreign Studies"

Pusan
 Pusan National University

Other uses
 Busan International Film Festival
 Busan International Fireworks Festival
 Goodbye, Dragon Inn (不散, "Bu san"), 2003 Taiwanese film

See also

 
 
 
 
 San (disambiguation)
 BU (disambiguation)
 Boo (disambiguation)

 San Bu